Yermekeyevo (Yärmäkäy) is a rural locality (a selo) and the administrative center of Yermekeyevsky District in Bashkortostan, Russia. Population:

References

Rural localities in Yermekeyevsky District